Cuq is a commune in the Lot-et-Garonne department in south-western France with about 280 inhabitants. The local windmill has been restored twice after 300 years of inactivity, first in 1997 and again in 2012, so that it can produce flour and its oven can bake bread.

Geography
The river Auroue forms all of the commune's eastern border.

See also
Communes of the Lot-et-Garonne department

References

Communes of Lot-et-Garonne